Leanne Marshall (born October 10, 1980 in Yuba City, California) is a fashion designer in Portland, Oregon. She was the winner of season 5 of Project Runway.

Project Runway
Leanne Marshall and Wesley Nault were the bottom two design contestants in Episode 2 of Project Runway, "The Grass Is Always Greener". In Episode 3, "Bright Lights, Big City", Marshall was among the top three design contestants. She maintained a good stride throughout the rest of the competition, consecutively winning two challenges: "Fashion that Drives You" and "Double 0 Fashion".

Marshall was chosen as one of the final top three design contestants and designed a wave-inspired collection for the final competition. Leanne Marshall's feminine waves captured the judges and she became the winner of Season 5.

Design career
Marshall began her runway fashion career in 2006 and 2007 at Portland Fashion Week in Portland, Oregon. After a year and a half of hard work developing the line, Leanne's popularity grew and so did her sales. In mid 2007, she was able to leave her money job behind and make the leap into designing her own label full-time.

In 2008, Leanne was selected as a contestant for Season 5 of Project Runway. She made it all the way to the finale where she showed her wave inspired collection in shades of turquoise, ivory and sand. She was crowned the winner.
Marshall created an eco-friendly line for bluefly.com that debuted in July 2009.  At that same time, she also designed a maternity dress for Heidi Klum.

Fresh after her Project Runway win, Leanne relocated to New York City where she continued to develop her line.

After years of designing custom bridal gowns, Leanne officially launched her signature bridal line in 2011. The bridal collection is carried in over 18 boutiques internationally and online. In 2014, she released an exclusive selection of dresses with BHLDN.

Her design studio and flagship showroom is located in New York City's Fashion District.

References

Interviews
 EW.com, October 16, 2008
 BuddyTV.com, October 16, 2008
 CurrentVine.com, September 24, 2008
 Etsy.com, August 13, 2008

American fashion designers
Reality show winners
Project Runway (American series) participants
Artists from Portland, Oregon
Living people
People from Yuba City, California
1980 births
American women fashion designers